Mount Crest is an unincorporated community in Bledsoe County, Tennessee, United States.  It lies along State Route 30 northwest of the city of Pikeville, the county seat of Bledsoe County.

References

Unincorporated communities in Bledsoe County, Tennessee
Unincorporated communities in Tennessee